Heidrich is a German surname. Notable people with the surname include:

Matthias Heidrich (born 1977), German footballer
Richard Heidrich (1896–1947), German general
Steffen Heidrich (born 1967), German footballer
Theodore Heidrich (1930–2010), American politician

See also
Reinhard Heydrich (1904–1942), high-ranking German Nazi official and Holocaust perpetrator
Heydrich (surname)
Hydrick

German-language surnames